Haywire is a 2011 action thriller film directed by Steven Soderbergh, starring Gina Carano, Michael Fassbender, Ewan McGregor, Bill Paxton, Channing Tatum, Antonio Banderas, and Michael Douglas. Carano, a mixed martial arts fighter, performs her own stunts in the film. The score is by DJ and composer David Holmes.

The plot centers on Mallory Kane (Carano), a black ops operative who is betrayed by her employers and targeted for assassination in a conspiracy that she is forced to unravel. The film premiered on November 6, 2011 at the American Film Institute's AFI Fest and received a wide release on January 20, 2012 by Relativity Media. It had generally positive critical reception, with critics praising its action, choreography, performances and Soderbergh's direction, but with some criticism levied at newcomer Carano's performance. The film grossed $34.5 million.

Plot
At an Upstate New York diner, a woman named Mallory Kane meets an associate of hers named Aaron. The two have a seemingly affable conversation, before Aaron demands she get in a car outside. When she refuses, he attacks her and pulls a gun, but she disarms and pistol whips him. Meanwhile Scott, a customer, had intervened to help Mallory, who proceeds to demand his car keys and that he get in his car to go away with her. As they flee, she explains who she is and what has happened to her.

Mallory explains that she and Aaron are operatives of a secretive private intelligence firm that handles highly sensitive black operations covertly so that their employers can maintain plausible deniability. One week earlier, the firm's director and Mallory's ex-boyfriend Kenneth gave her an assignment offered by CIA agent Coblenz; to rescue Jiang, a Chinese national being held hostage in a Barcelona apartment. Mallory and her team, including Aaron, successfully pull off the job and deliver the mark to a local contact named Rodrigo.

Upon returning to the United States, Mallory is approached by Kenneth with what he claims is a simple assignment: pose as the wife of MI6 agent Paul during a mission in Dublin. Mallory agrees and accompanies Paul to a party at Russborough House, where they meet with his contact, Studer. As Mallory watches from afar, she sees Paul go into a barn. Upon entering, she finds Jiang dead, clutching in his hand a brooch which Kenneth had insisted she wear as a recognition signal for her initial contact with Paul. Mallory realizes she has been set up.

On returning to their hotel room, Paul attacks Mallory and tries to kill her, but she manages to fend him off and shoot him dead. Checking Paul's phone, she redials a missed call only for Kenneth to pick up, asking if "the divorce was final". Kenneth realizes he's been made, and sends his agents after her. She narrowly avoids both of them and the police, escaping onto a ferry to England.

Mallory calls Rodrigo and demands to know if it was he or Kenneth who set her up. Rodrigo calls Coblenz, who then calls Mallory, telling her that he has had suspicions about Kenneth before claiming to arrange a meeting between the two in an Upstate New York diner. Coblenz then contacts Kenneth and tells him to inform Mallory's father, John, of her purported crimes.

In the present, Mallory and Scott are captured by police. Both are taken into custody but the police are ambushed and killed by Kenneth's men. Mallory manages to kill one of them and flees with Scott in one of the police cars. She releases Scott and leaves to meet with her father. She reaches his house in New Mexico before Kenneth, Aaron and two other men arrive to interrogate him about his daughter's whereabouts. Aaron receives a photograph on his phone of Jiang lying dead, and it dawns on him that Mallory might have been set up. He tries to press Kenneth for the truth, but Kenneth shoots him and escapes, as Mallory takes out Kenneth's other men. Aaron apologizes to Mallory as he dies in her arms.

Mallory meets Coblenz, who reveals that he told Kenneth to contact Mallory's father, expecting that Kenneth would go to her father's house and that she would kill him there. Coblenz also gives her Kenneth's present location. Before they part, he offers her a job with the CIA, but she says she will respond after she has found Kenneth.

In Mexico, Mallory confronts Kenneth on a beach and they fight. Kenneth's foot becomes jammed between rocks. Unable to escape, he reveals that Jiang was a journalist who was being protected in a safe house after having exposed Studer's ties to a human trafficking ring. Knowing that Mallory planned to leave his firm, Kenneth arranged for her to kidnap Jiang and deliver him to Rodrigo, who delivered him to Studer, who killed him. Kenneth then framed Mallory, planning to cut all ties that could lead to him, telling Paul the cover story he would have in place after Paul had killed her in alleged self-defense. Ignoring Kenneth's pleas, Mallory leaves Kenneth to drown in the incoming tide.

A few days later, Mallory locates Rodrigo, who is on vacation in Majorca. She approaches him to confront him.

Cast

 Gina Carano as Mallory Kane
 Ewan McGregor as Kenneth
 Michael Douglas as Alex Coblenz
 Michael Fassbender as Paul
 Bill Paxton as John Kane
 Channing Tatum as Aaron
 Antonio Banderas as Rodrigo
 Michael Angarano as Scott
 Mathieu Kassovitz as Studer
 Eddie J. Fernandez as Barroso
 Anthony Brandon Wong as Jiang
 J. J. Perry as Max
 Tim Connolly as Jason
 Maximino Arciniega as Gomez
 Aaron Cohen as Jamie
 Natascha Berg as Liliana

Development
Film development was announced in September 2009 with the title Knockout, later changed to Haywire. The screenplay was written to be shot in Dublin. The film was shot mostly in Ireland, with principal photography spanning from February 2, 2010 to March 25, 2010 with a budget of approximately $25 million.

Production 
In preparation for her role, Gina Carano underwent a six-week intensive tactical training course with former Duvdevan Unit officer Aaron Cohen, who has a cameo appearance in the finished film. She spent three hours a day in stunts and three hours a day with Cohen. During a particularly harrowing two-week period when Cohen was teaching Carano the art of surveillance and counter-surveillance, he and his team tracked her via a GPS system installed in her car.

Two locations included the former homes of Ireland’s Leeson family who as the Earls of Milltown were once described as “Arch Rebels” of the ascendancy. These included the interior of palatial Russborough House, where Paul and Mallory attend a party, and exterior of the Kildare Street and University Club, which Mallory passes while being tailed at St. Stephen’s Green.

The film was originally set to be released in late 2010, but re-shoots and a change in distributor from Lionsgate to Relativity Media delayed it for more than a year. During the intervening period, Soderbergh filmed and edited Contagion, which was ultimately released over a month in advance. Soderbergh reportedly clashed with Lionsgate, which wanted a more action-centric film in the vein of the Bourne series, while Soderbergh had intended a spy thriller interspersed with lengthy, realistic fight scenes. Following the change in distributor, Soderbergh's re-shoots and re-edits focused on reshaping the film to be more in line with his original vision.

During post-production, some of Carano's voice was overdubbed by actress Laura San Giacomo.

Music
David Holmes composed the score for the film and had worked with Steven Soderbergh on various other projects such as Out of Sight and the Ocean's trilogy.

Release

Critical response
The film received generally positive reviews from critics. Review aggregation website Rotten Tomatoes gives the film a score of  based on  reviews. The site's critical consensus reads, "MMA star and first-time actress Gina Carano displays ample action-movie chops in Haywire, a fast-paced thriller with a top-notch cast and outstanding direction from Steven Soderbergh." Metacritic gives it a weighted average score of 67/100 based on reviews from 40 critics. Audiences polled by CinemaScore gave the film an average grade of "D+" on an A+ to F scale.

Claudia Puig of USA Today stated that the film was "a vigorous spy thriller that consistently beckons the viewer to catch up with its narrative twists and turns. Bordering on convoluted, it works best when in combat mode." Andrew O'Hehir of Salon.com shared a similar view, saying "Haywire is a lean, clean production, shot and edited by Soderbergh himself and utterly free of the incoherent action sequences and overcooked special effects that plague similarly scaled Hollywood pictures."

Richard Corliss of Time said "Carano is her own best stuntwoman, but in the dialogue scenes she's all kick and no charisma. The MMA battler lacks the conviction she so forcefully displayed in the ring. She is not Haywires heroine but its hostage." Keith Uhlich of Time Out New York wrote, "There's shockingly little thrill in watching Carano bounce off walls and pummel antagonists."

Box office
Haywire was released on January 20, 2012 with an opening weekend gross of $8.4 million, and has earned $18.9 million in the United States and $34.5 million worldwide.

Home media
Haywire was released on DVD and Blu-ray disc on May 1, 2012.

References

External links
 
 
 
 

2011 films
English-language Irish films
2011 action thriller films
2011 martial arts films
2010s mystery thriller films
2010s spy films
American action thriller films
American Muay Thai films
American mystery thriller films
American spy films
Films directed by Steven Soderbergh
Films produced by Gregory Jacobs
Films scored by David Holmes (musician)
Films set in Barcelona
Films set in Dublin (city)
Films set in New York (state)
Films set in Washington, D.C.
Films shot in Barcelona
Films shot in the Republic of Ireland
Films with screenplays by Lem Dobbs
Girls with guns films
Gun fu films
Kung fu films
Relativity Media films
2010s English-language films
2010s American films